Enn Toona (13 January 1909 – Väinjärve Parish – 22 March 1973 Tallinn) was an Estonian actor and director.

1934-1935 he studied at Tartu Stage Art Studio. 1935–1936 he was an actor at Estonian Drama Theatre, 1936–1942 and 1943–1944 at Tallinna Töölisteater. 1947–1948 he was a director at Ugala Theatre. 1955-1957 he worked at Estonian Radio. 1964-1969 he was principal stage manager of Endla Theatre.

Theatre productions

 Ohlson's "Ehast koiduni" (1939)
 Korneitšuk's "Platon Kretšet" (1941 and 1965)
 Goldon's "Kahe isanda teener" (1942 in Vanemuine Theatre)

References

1909 births
1973 deaths
Estonian male stage actors
Estonian male radio actors
20th-century Estonian male actors
Estonian theatre directors
People from Järva Parish
Burials at Pärnamäe Cemetery